This is a list of the members of the 7th Seanad Éireann, the upper house of the Oireachtas (legislature) of Ireland. These Senators were elected or appointed in 1951, after the 1951 general election and served until the close of poll for the 8th Seanad in 1954.

Composition of the 7th Seanad
There are a total of 60 seats in the Seanad. 43 Senators are elected by the Vocational panels, 6 elected by the Universities and 11 are nominated by the Taoiseach.

The following table shows the composition by party when the 7th Seanad first met on 14 August 1951.

List of senators

Changes

See also
Members of the 14th Dáil
Government of the 14th Dáil

References

External links

 
07